The British Poultry Standard is the oldest poultry fancy breed standard in the world. It is published by the Poultry Club of Great Britain and is the official reference standard used by judges at poultry shows within the United Kingdom and the Republic of Ireland.

History

The standard was first published in 1865 by the original Poultry Club of Great Britain, a club which existed for only three years. It was entitled The standard of excellence in Exhibition Poultry and was edited by William Bernhardt Tegetmeier. It was the first publication of its kind. The compilation of the standard was then taken over by the second, current Poultry Club of Great Britain. The number of editions of the standard that have been published is uncertain, as each successive publisher that has been used by the Poultry Club of Great Britain has started again with a first edition. The current edition, published in 2008 by Blackwell, is the sixth in the current numbering.

Use

The standard is the official reference for use by judges at poultry shows in the United Kingdom and the Republic of Ireland. It contains breed standards of more than 150 breeds of chickens, ducks, geese and turkeys; pigeons are not included.

Editions

Editions of the standards include, but probably are not limited to, these:

 William Bernhard Tegetmeier (editor). The Standard of Excellence in Exhibition Poultry, authorized by the Poultry Club. London: Groombridge and Sons, for the Poultry Club, 1865.
 . The Poultry Book: comprising the breeding and management of profitable and ornamental poultry, their qualities and characteristics; to which is added the Standard of Excellence in exhibition birds, authorized by the Poultry Club. [S.l.]: Routledge, 1867.
 , Harrison Weir (illustrator). The Poultry Book: comprising the breeding and management of profitable and ornamental poultry, their qualities and characteristics; to which is added "The Standard of Excellence in Exhibition Birds," authorized by the Poultry Club. London; New York : George Routledge and Sons, the Broadway, Ludgate, 1867.
 [A.M. Halsted]. The Standard of Excellence as adopted by the American Poultry Society, being a reprint of the same as compiled and adopted by the London Poultry Club, with alterations and additions, adapting it to America. New York: A.M. Halsted, 1867.
 William Bernhard Tegetmeier, Harrison Weir (illustrator). The Poultry Book: comprising the breeding and management of profitable and ornamental poultry, their qualities and characteristics; to which is added "The Standard of Excellence in Exhibition Birds," authorized by the Poultry Club. New edition, greatly enlarged. London; New York : George Routledge and Sons, the Broadway, Ludgate, 1873.
 . The standard of excellence in exhibition poultry, authorised by the Poultry Club, to which is added the American standard. Reprinted from the original editions, with additions. London, 1874.
 Alexander Comyns (editor). The Standard of Perfection for Exhibition Poultry. London: Office of the Poultry Club, [1886].
 T. Threlford (editor), Lewis Wright (introduction). The Poultry Club Standards, containing a complete description of all the recognised varieties of fowls, second edition. London; Paris; New York; Melbourne: Cassell & Company, 1901.
 Lewis Wright. The New Book of Poultry. With Forty-Five Plates, by J.W. Ludlow, and the Poultry Club Standards of Perfection for the Various Breeds. London; Paris; New York; Melbourne: Cassell and Company, 1902. (reprinted 1904)
 T. Threlford (editor), Lewis Wright (introduction). The Poultry Club Standards. Containing a complete description of all the recognised varieties of fowls, third edition. London: Cassell, 1905.
 Sidney Hubert Lewer, Lewis Wright. Wright's Book of Poultry. Revised and edited in accordance with the latest Poultry Club standards by S. H. Lewer. London; Paris; New York; Melbourne: Cassell and Company, [n.d., after 1910].
 William White Broomhead (editor). The Poultry Club Standards: containing a complete description of all the recognised varieties of fowls, ducks, geese and turkeys, fifth edition. London: The Poultry Club, 1922.
 . The Poultry Club Standards, sixth edition. London: Poultry Club of Great Britain, 1923.
 . The Poultry Club Standards, seventh edition. London: The Poultry Club, 1926.
 . The Poultry Club Standards, eighth edition. London: The Poultry Club, 1930.
 [Poultry Club of Great Britain]. British Poultry Standards: Complete specifications and judging points of all standardised breeds and varieties of poultry as compiled by the specialist breed societies and recognised by The Poultry Club of Great Britain. London: Poultry World in association with the Poultry Club of Great Britain, [1954].
 [Poultry Club of Great Britain]. British Poultry Standards. Complete specifications and judging points of all standardised breeds and varieties of poultry as compiled by the specialist breed societies and recognised by the Poultry Club of Great Britain, revised edition, with illustrations. London: Poultry World, [1960].
 C. George May (editor). British Poultry Standards: Complete specifications and judging points of all standardized breeds and varieties of poultry as compiled by the Specialist Breed Societies and recognized by the Poultry Club of Great Britain. London: Iliffe Books, 1971.
 , David Hawksworth. British Poultry Standards: Complete specifications and judging points of all standardized breeds and varieties of poultry as compiled by the Specialist Breed Societies and recognized by the Poultry Club of Great Britain. London; Boston: Butterworth Scientific, 1982.
 . British Poultry Standards: Complete specifications and judging points of all standardized breeds and varieties of poultry as compiled by the Specialist Breed Societies and recognized by the Poultry Club of Great Britain, fourth edition, revised by David Hawksworth. Oxford: Blackwell Scientific, 1994. .
 Victoria Roberts (editor). British Poultry Standards: Complete specifications and judging points of all standardized breeds and varieties of poultry as compiled by the Specialist Breed Societies and recognized by the Poultry Club of Great Britain, fifth edition. Oxford: Blackwell Science, 1997. .
 . British Poultry Standards: Complete specifications and judging points of all standardized breeds and varieties of poultry as compiled by the Specialist Breed Clubs and recognised by the Poultry Club of Great Britain. Oxford: Blackwell, 2008. .

References

Handbooks and manuals
Poultry standards
Standards of the United Kingdom